"Lay Down" is a song by Australian rock band DMA's. It was released in September 2015 as the lead single from their debut album Hills End. The song was premiered on Annie Mac's BBC 1 show and was certified gold in Australia in 2019.

Reception
Cady Siregar from Stereo Gum said the song "intertwines jangly, dreamy shoegaze with uncompromising noise".

Certifications

References

2015 singles
2015 songs
DMA's songs